Elections to Chorley Borough Council were held on 3 May 2012.  One third of the council was up for election and the Labour Party won majority control from the Conservative-Liberal Democrat Coalition. 
Labour gaining control of this council was notable as David Cameron visited the town in 2006 when the Conservative Party gained control saying "this is the beginning." Nick Robinson of the BBC asked on the election coverage, "then what is it now?"

Council make-up
After the election, the composition of the council was:

Election result

Results map

Wards

Adlington and Anderton

Brindle and Hoghton ward

Chorley East ward

Chorley North East ward

Chorley North West ward

N.B. Percentage change is taken from when a Snape last faced the electorate.

Chorley South East ward

Chorley South West ward

Clayton-le-Woods and Whittle-le-Woods ward

Clayton-le-Woods North ward

Coppull ward

Eccleston and Mawdesley ward

Euxton North ward

Heath Charnock and Rivington ward

Lostock ward

Wheelton and Withnell ward

References

2012
2012 English local elections
2010s in Lancashire